Moechohecyra verrucicollis is a species of beetle in the family Cerambycidae. It was described by Gahan in 1895. It is known in Myanmar, Laos, India, Sri Lanka and Vietnam.

References

Crossotini
Beetles described in 1895